The spinal trigeminal nucleus is a nucleus in the medulla that receives information about deep/crude touch, pain, and temperature from the ipsilateral face. In addition to the trigeminal nerve (CN V), the facial (CN VII), glossopharyngeal (CN IX), and vagus nerves (CN X) also convey pain information from their areas to the spinal trigeminal nucleus. Thus the spinal trigeminal nucleus receives input from cranial nerves V, VII, IX, and X.

The spinal nucleus is composed of three subnuclei: subnucleus oralis (pars oralis), subnucleus caudalis (pars caudalis), and subnucleus interpolaris (pars interpolaris).  The subnucleus oralis is associated with the transmission of discriminative (fine) tactile sense from the orofacial region, and is continuous with the principal sensory nucleus of V. The subnucleus interpolaris is also associated with the transmission of tactile sense, as well as dental pain, whereas the subnucleus caudalis is associated with the transmission of nociception and thermal sensations from the head.

This region is also denoted at sp5 in other neuroanatomical nomenclature.

This nucleus projects to the ventral posteriomedial (VPM) nucleus in the contralateral thalamus via the ventral trigeminal tract. In mice, this thalamic nucleus has significant amounts of expression of leptin receptors, NPY and GLP-1.

See also
 Trigeminal nerve nuclei

References

Cranial nerve nuclei
Medulla oblongata
Facial nerve
Glossopharyngeal nerve
Trigeminal nerve
Vagus nerve